

Events

Pre-1600 
85 – Nerva, suspected of complicity of the death of Domitian, is declared emperor by Senate. The Senate then annuls laws passed by Domitian and orders his statues to be destroyed. 
 634 – Siege of Damascus: The Rashidun Arabs under Khalid ibn al-Walid capture Damascus from the Byzantine Empire.
1356 – Battle of Poitiers: An English army under the command of Edward the Black Prince defeats a French army and captures King John II.
1410 – End of the Siege of Marienburg: The State of the Teutonic Order repulses the joint Polish—Lithuanian forces.

1601–1900
1676 – Jamestown is burned to the ground by the forces of Nathaniel Bacon during Bacon's Rebellion. 
1777 – American Revolutionary War: British forces win a tactically expensive victory over the Continental Army in the First Battle of Saratoga.
1778 – The Continental Congress passes the first United States federal budget.
1796 – George Washington's Farewell Address is printed across America as an open letter to the public.
1799 – French Revolutionary Wars: French-Dutch victory against the Russians and British in the Battle of Bergen.
1846 – Two French shepherd children, Mélanie Calvat and Maximin Giraud, experience a Marian apparition on a mountaintop near La Salette, France, now known as Our Lady of La Salette.
1852 – Annibale de Gasparis discovers the asteroid Massalia from the north dome of the Astronomical Observatory of Capodimonte.
1862 – American Civil War: Union troops under William Rosecrans defeat a Confederate force commanded by Sterling Price.
1863 – American Civil War: The first day of the Battle of Chickamauga, in northwestern Georgia, the bloodiest two-day battle of the conflict, and the only significant Confederate victory in the war's Western Theater.
1864 – American Civil War: Union troops under Philip Sheridan defeat a Confederate force commanded by Jubal Early. With over 50,000 troops engaged, it was the largest battle fought in the Shenandoah Valley.
1868 – La Gloriosa begins in Spain.
1870 – Franco-Prussian War: The siege of Paris begins. The city held out for over four months before surrendering.
1893 – In New Zealand, the Electoral Act of 1893 is consented to by the governor, giving all women in New Zealand the right to vote.

1901–present
1916 – World War I: During the East African Campaign, colonial forces of the Belgian Congo (Force Publique) under the command of Charles Tombeur capture the town of Tabora after heavy fighting.
1939 – World War II: The Battle of Kępa Oksywska concludes, with Polish losses reaching roughly 14% of all the forces engaged.
1940 – World War II: Witold Pilecki is voluntarily captured and sent to Auschwitz concentration camp to gather and smuggle out information for the resistance movement.
1944 – World War II: The Battle of Hürtgen Forest begins. It will become the longest individual battle that the U.S. Army has ever fought.
  1944   – World War II: The Moscow Armistice between Finland and the Soviet Union is signed, which officially ended the Continuation War. 
1946 – The Council of Europe is founded following a speech by Winston Churchill at the University of Zurich.
1950 – Korean War: An attack by North Korean forces was repelled at the Battle of Nam River.
1957 – Plumbbob Rainier becomes the first nuclear explosion to be entirely contained underground, producing no fallout.
1970 – Michael Eavis hosts the first Glastonbury Festival.  
  1970   – Kostas Georgakis, a Greek student of geology, sets himself ablaze in Matteotti Square in Genoa, Italy, as a protest against the dictatorial regime of Georgios Papadopoulos.
1976 – Turkish Airlines Flight 452 hits the Taurus Mountains, outskirt of Karatepe, Turkey, killing all 154 passengers and crew.
  1976   – Two Imperial Iranian Air Force F-4 Phantom II jets fly out to investigate an unidentified flying object, when both independently lose instrumentation and communications as they approach, only to have them restored upon withdrawal.
1978 – The Solomon Islands join the United Nations.
1982 – Scott Fahlman posts the first documented emoticons :-) and :-( on the Carnegie Mellon University bulletin board system.
1983 – Saint Kitts and Nevis gains its independence.
1985 – A strong earthquake kills thousands and destroys about 400 buildings in Mexico City.
  1985 – Tipper Gore and other political wives form the Parents Music Resource Center as Frank Zappa, John Denver, and other musicians testify at U.S. Congressional hearings on obscenity in rock music.
1989 – A bomb destroys UTA Flight 772 in mid-air above the Tùnùrù Desert, Niger, killing all 170 passengers and crew.
1991 – Ötzi the Iceman is discovered in the Alps on the border between Italy and Austria.
1995 – The Washington Post and The New York Times publish the Unabomber manifesto.
1997 – The Guelb El-Kebir massacre in Algeria kills 53 people.
2006 – The Thai army stages a coup. The Constitution is revoked and martial law is declared.
2010 – The leaking oil well in the Deepwater Horizon oil spill is sealed.
2011 – Mariano Rivera of the New York Yankees surpasses Trevor Hoffman to become Major League Baseball's all-time career saves leader with 602.
2016 – In the wake of a manhunt, the suspect in a series of bombings in New York and New Jersey is apprehended after a shootout with police.
2017 – The 2017 Puebla earthquake strikes Mexico, causing 370 deaths and over 6,000 injuries, as well as extensive damage.
2019 – A drone strike by the United States kills 30 civilian farmers in Afghanistan.
2021 – The Cumbre Vieja volcano, on the island of La Palma in the Canary Islands, erupts. The eruption lasts for almost three months, ending on December 13.
2022 – The state funeral of Queen Elizabeth II of the United Kingdom is held at Westminster Abbey, London.

Births

Pre-1600
AD 86 – Antoninus Pius, Roman emperor (d. 161)
 866 – Leo VI the Wise, Byzantine emperor (d. 912)
 931 – Mu Zong, emperor of the Liao Dynasty (d. 969)
1377 – Albert IV, Duke of Austria (d. 1404)
1426 – Marie of Cleves, Duchess of Orléans, French noble (d. 1487)
1477 – Ferrante d'Este, Ferrarese nobleman and condottiero (d. 1540)
1551 – Henry III of France (d. 1589)
1560 – Thomas Cavendish, English naval explorer, led the third expedition to circumnavigate the globe (d. 1592)

1601–1900
1608 – Alfonso Litta, Roman Catholic cardinal and archbishop (d. 1679)
1638 – Isaac Milles, English minister (d. 1720)
1662 – Jean-Paul Bignon, French priest and man of letters (d. 1743)
1721 – William Robertson, Scottish historian (d. 1793)
1749 – Jean Baptiste Joseph Delambre, French mathematician and astronomer (d. 1822)
1754 – John Ross Key, American lieutenant, lawyer, and judge (d. 1821)
1759 – William Kirby, English priest and entomologist (d. 1850)
1778 – Henry Brougham, 1st Baron Brougham and Vaux, Scottish lawyer and politician, Lord Chancellor of Great Britain (d. 1868)
1796 – Hartley Coleridge, English poet and author (d. 1849)
1802 – Lajos Kossuth, Hungarian journalist, lawyer, and politician, Governor-President of Hungary (d. 1894)
1803 – Maria Anna of Savoy (d. 1884)
1811 – Orson Pratt, American mathematician and religious leader (d. 1881)
1824 – William Sellers, American engineer, inventor, and businessperson (d. 1905)
1828 – Fridolin Anderwert, Swiss judge and politician, President of the Swiss National Council (d. 1880)
1856 – Arthur Morgan, Australian politician, 16th Premier of Queensland (d. 1916) 
1865 – Frank Eugene, American-German photographer (d. 1936)
1867 – Arthur Rackham, English illustrator (d. 1939)
1869 – Ben Turpin, American comedian and actor (d. 1940)
1871 – Frederick Ruple, Swiss-American painter (d. 1938)
1882 – Christopher Stone, English radio host (d. 1965)
1883 – Mabel Vernon, American educator and activist (d. 1975)
1887 – Lovie Austin, American pianist, composer, and bandleader (d. 1972)
  1887   – Lynne Overman, American actor and singer  (d. 1943)
1888 – James Waddell Alexander II, American mathematician and topologist (d. 1971)
  1888   – Porter Hall, American actor (d. 1953)
1889 – Sarah Louise Delany, American physician and author (d. 1999)
1894 – Rachel Field, American author and poet (d. 1942)
1898 – Giuseppe Saragat, Italian lawyer and politician, 5th President of Italy (d. 1988)
1900 – Ricardo Cortez, American actor (d. 1977)

1901–present
1905 – Judith Auer, German World War II resistance fighter (d. 1944)
  1905   – Leon Jaworski, American lawyer, co-founded Fulbright & Jaworski (d. 1982)
1907 – Lewis F. Powell, Jr., American lawyer and jurist (d. 1998)
1908 – Paul Bénichou, French historian, author, and critic (d. 2001)
  1908   – Robert Lecourt, French lawyer, judge, and politician, Lord Chancellor of France (d. 2004)
  1908   – Tatsuo Shimabuku, Japanese martial artist, founded Isshin-ryū (d. 1975)
1909 – Ferdinand Porsche, Austrian engineer and businessman (d. 1998)
1910 – Margaret Lindsay, American actress (d. 1981)
  1910   – Arturo M. Tolentino, Filipino diplomat and politician (d. 2004)
1911 – William Golding, British novelist, playwright, and poet, Nobel Prize laureate (d. 1993)
1912 – Reuben David, Indian veterinarian and zoo founder (d. 1989)
  1912   – Kurt Sanderling, Polish-German conductor (d. 2011)
1913 – Frances Farmer, American actress (d. 1970)
  1913   – Helen Ward, American singer (d. 1998) 
1915 – Germán Valdés, Mexican actor, singer, and producer (d. 1973) 
1918 – Pablita Velarde, Santa Clara Pueblo (Native American) painter (d. 2006)
1919 – Roger Grenier, French journalist and author (d. 2017)
  1919   – Amalia Hernández, Mexican choreographer and dancer (d. 2000)
1920 – Roger Angell, American journalist, author, and editor (d. 2022) 
1921 – Paulo Freire, Brazilian philosopher, theorist, and academic (d. 1997)
  1921   – Billy Ward, American R&B singer-songwriter (d. 2002)
1922 – Damon Knight, American author and critic (d. 2002)
  1922   – Willie Pep, American boxer and referee (d. 2006)
  1922   – Emil Zátopek, Czech runner (d. 2000)
1924 – Vern Benson, American baseball player, coach, and manager (d. 2014)
  1924   – Don Harron, Canadian actor and screenwriter (d. 2015)
  1925   – W. Reece Smith, Jr., American lawyer and academic (d. 2013)
1926 – Victoria Barbă, Moldovan animated film director (d. 2020)
  1926   – Masatoshi Koshiba, Japanese physicist and academic, Nobel Prize laureate  (d. 2020)
  1926   – James Lipton, American actor, producer, and screenwriter (d. 2020)
  1926   – Duke Snider, American baseball player and sportscaster (d. 2011)
1927 – Helen Carter, American singer (d. 1998)
  1927   – Rosemary Harris, English actress
  1927   – William Hickey, American actor (d. 1997)
  1927   – Nick Massi, American singer and bass player (d. 2000)
1928 – Adam West, American actor and businessman (d. 2017)
1929 – Marge Roukema, American educator and politician (d. 2014)
1930 – Muhal Richard Abrams, American pianist, composer, and educator (d. 2017)
  1930   – Bettye Lane, American photographer and journalist (d. 2012)
  1930   – Antonio Margheriti, Italian director, producer, and screenwriter (d. 2002)
1931 – Brook Benton, American pop/R&B/rock & roll singer-songwriter (d. 1988)
  1931   – Derek Gardner, English engineer (d. 2011)
1932 – Mike Royko, American journalist and author (d. 1997)
  1932   – Stefanie Zweig, German journalist and author (d. 2014)
1933 – Gilles Archambault, Canadian journalist and author
  1933   – David McCallum, Scottish actor 
1934 – Brian Epstein, English businessman, The Beatles manager (d. 1967)
  1934   – Austin Mitchell, English journalist, academic and politician (d. 2021)
1935 – Benjamin Thurman Hacker, American admiral (d. 2003)
1936 – Martin Fay, Irish fiddler (d. 2012)
  1936   – Milan Marcetta, Canadian ice hockey player (d. 2014)
  1936   – Al Oerter, American discus thrower (d. 2007)
1937 – Abner Haynes, American football player
1939 – Carl Schultz, Hungarian-Australian director, producer, and screenwriter
1940 – Bill Medley, American singer-songwriter 
  1940   – Zandra Rhodes, English fashion designer, founded the Fashion and Textile Museum
  1940   – Paul Williams, American singer-songwriter and actor
1941 – Umberto Bossi, Italian politician
  1941   – Cass Elliot, American singer (d. 1974)
  1941   – Jim Fox, English pentathlete
  1941   – Mariangela Melato, Italian actress (d. 2013)
1942 – Freda Payne, American singer and actress
1943 – André Boudrias, Canadian ice hockey player and coach (d. 2019)
  1943   – Joe Morgan, American baseball player (d. 2020)
1944 – Anders Björck, Swedish politician, 25th Swedish Minister of Defence
  1944   – Edmund Joensen, Faroese politician, 9th Prime Minister of the Faroe Islands
  1944   – İsmet Özel, Turkish poet and scholar
1945 – Kate Adie, English journalist and author
  1945   – David Bromberg, American multi-instrumentalist, singer, and songwriter
  1945   – Randolph Mantooth, American actor 
1946 – Gerald Brisco, American wrestler
  1946   – Brian Henton, English race car driver
1947 – Henry Bromell,  American novelist and screenwriter (d. 2013)
  1947   – Thomas H. Cook, American author and academic
  1947   – Lol Creme, English musician, songwriter, and music video director 
  1947   – Brian Hill, American basketball player and coach
  1947   – Tanith Lee, English author (d. 2015)
1948 – Mykhaylo Fomenko, Ukrainian footballer and manager
  1948   – Jeremy Irons, English actor 
1949 – Twiggy, English model, actress, and singer
  1949   – Ringo Mendoza, Mexican wrestler
  1949   – Barry Scheck, American lawyer, co-founded the Innocence Project
1950 – Joan Lunden, American television journalist,  anchor, and author
  1950   – Michael Proctor, English physicist, mathematician, and academic
1951 – Daniel Lanois, Canadian singer-songwriter, guitarist, and producer
1952 – Rhys Chatham, American trumpet player, guitarist, and composer
  1952   – Henry Kaiser, American guitarist and composer
  1952   – Nile Rodgers, American guitarist, songwriter, and producer 
  1952   – George Warrington, American businessman (d. 2007)
1953 – Wayne Clark, Australian cricketer
  1953   – Sarana VerLin, American singer-songwriter and violinist
1954 – Adam Phillips, Welsh psychotherapist and author
  1954   – Eleni Vitali, Greek singer-songwriter
1955 – Richard Burmer, American composer and engineer (d. 2006)
1957 – Chris Roupas, American basketball player
1958 – Lita Ford, English-American singer-songwriter and guitarist 
  1958   – Kevin Hooks, American actor, director, and producer
1960 – Mario Batali, American chef and author
  1960   – Loïc Bigois, French aerodynamicist and engineer
  1960   – Yolanda Saldívar, American murderer 
1961 – Artur Ekert, Polish-British physicist and academic
1962 – Cheri Oteri, American actress, comedian, and screenwriter
  1962   – Ken Rosenthal, American sportscaster
1963 – Jarvis Cocker, English singer-songwriter and guitarist
  1963   – David Seaman, English footballer
  1963   – Urmas Tartes, Estonian biologist and photographer
1964 – Patrick Marber, English actor, director, and screenwriter
  1964   – Daniel Wincott, British political scientist
  1964   – Trisha Yearwood, American singer-songwriter and actress
1965 – Andrew Leeds, Australian rugby player and coach
  1965   – Tim Scott, American politician
  1965   – Sunita Williams, American captain, pilot, and astronaut
1966 – Soledad O'Brien, American journalist and producer
  1966   – Yoshihiro Takayama, Japanese wrestler and mixed martial artist
1967 – Jim Abbott, American baseball player
  1967   – Aleksandr Karelin, Russian wrestler and politician
  1968   – Monica Crowley, American talk show host and author 
1969 – Candy Dulfer, Dutch saxophonist
  1969   – Jacek Frąckiewicz, Polish footballer
  1969   – Alkinoos Ioannidis, Cypriot singer-songwriter and guitarist
  1969   – Michael Symon, American chef and author
  1969   – Kostya Tszyu, Russian-Australian boxer
  1969   – Tapio Wilska, Finnish singer-songwriter 
1970 – Dan Bylsma, American ice hockey player and coach
  1970   – Gilbert Dionne, Canadian ice hockey player
  1970   – Antoine Hey, German footballer and manager
  1970   – Victor Williams, American actor
1971 – Sanaa Lathan, American actress
  1971   – Mike Sadlo, German footballer and manager
1972 – Ryan Girdler, Australian rugby league player
  1972   – N. K. Jemisin, American writer
  1972   – Ashot Nadanian, Armenian chess player and coach
1973 – Nick Colgan, Irish footballer and coach
  1973   – Cristiano da Matta, Brazilian race car driver
  1973   – David Zepeda, Mexican actor, model and singer
  1973   – Javier Duarte, Mexican politician
1974 – Jimmy Fallon, American comedian and talk show host
1975 – Marcus Dunstan, American director and screenwriter
1976 – Raja Bell, American basketball player
  1976   – Jan Hlaváč, Czech ice hockey player
  1976   – Alison Sweeney, American actress and television host 
  1976   – Sergey Tsinkevich, Belarusian footballer and referee
1977 – Poon Yiu Cheuk, Hong Kong footballer and coach
  1977   – Aakash Chopra, Indian cricketer
  1977   – Ryan Dusick, American musician and record producer 
  1977   – Tommaso Rocchi, Italian footballer
  1977   – Mike Smith, American baseball player
  1977   – Emil Sutovsky, Israeli chess player
1978 – Nick Johnson, American baseball player
  1978   – Jorge López Montaña, Spanish footballer
  1978   – Nigel Mitchell, English radio and television host
1980 – James Ellison, English motorcycle racer
  1980   – Dimitri Yachvili, French rugby player 
1981 – Damiano Cunego, Italian cyclist
  1981   – Rick DiPietro, American ice hockey player
1982 – Shaun Barker, English footballer
  1982   – Eduardo Carvalho, Portuguese footballer
  1982   – Eleni Daniilidou, Greek tennis player
  1982   – Jordan Parise, American ice hockey player
1984 – Eva Marie, American wrestler
  1984   – Ángel Reyna, Mexican footballer 
  1984   – Danny Valencia, American baseball player
1985 – Gio González, American baseball player
  1985   – Alun Wyn Jones, Welsh rugby player
  1985   – Song Joong-ki, South Korean actor
  1985   – Nathanael Liminski, German politician
1986 – Leon Best, English footballer
  1986   – Sally Pearson, Australian athlete
1987 – Carlos Quintero, Colombian footballer
1988 – Kenny Britt, American football player
1989 – Tyreke Evans, American basketball player
  1989   – George Springer, American baseball player
1990 – Saki Fukuda, Japanese actress and singer
  1990   – Savvas Gentsoglou, Greek footballer
  1990   – Kieran Trippier, English footballer
1992 – Jiro Kuroshio, Japanese wrestler
  1992   – Diego Antonio Reyes, Mexican footballer
1996 – Dejounte Murray, American basketball player
1998 – Trae Young, American basketball player

Deaths

Pre-1600
 643 – Goeric of Metz, Frankish bishop and saint
 690 – Theodore of Tarsus, English archbishop and saint (b. 602)
 961 – Helena Lekapene, Byzantine empress 
 979 – Gotofredo I, archbishop of Milan
1123 – Emperor Taizu of Jin (b. 1068)
1147 – Igor II of Kiev
1339 – Emperor Go-Daigo of Japan (b. 1288)
1356 – Peter I, Duke of Bourbon (b. 1311)
  1356   – Walter VI, Count of Brienne (b. 1304)
1580 – Catherine Brandon, Duchess of Suffolk, English noblewoman (b. 1519)
1589 – Jean-Antoine de Baïf, French poet (b. 1532)

1601–1900
1605 – Edward Lewknor, English politician (b. 1542)
1668 – William Waller, English general and politician (b. 1597)
1692 – Giles Corey, American farmer and accused wizard (b. c. 1612)
1710 – Ole Rømer, Danish astronomer and instrument maker (b. 1644)
1812 – Mayer Amschel Rothschild, German banker (b. 1744)
1843 – Gaspard-Gustave de Coriolis, French mathematician,  physicist, and engineer (b. 1792)
1863 – Hans Christian Heg, Norwegian-American colonel and politician (b. 1829)
1868 – William Sprague, American minister and politician (b. 1809)
1873 – Robert Mackenzie, English-Australian politician, 3rd Premier of Queensland (b. 1811)
1881 – James A. Garfield, American general, lawyer, and politician, and the 20th President of the United States (b. 1831)
1893 – Alexander Tilloch Galt, English-Canadian politician, 1st Canadian Minister of Finance (b. 1817)

1901–present
1902 – Masaoka Shiki, Japanese poet, author, and critic (b. 1867)
1905 – Thomas John Barnardo, Irish-English philanthropist (b. 1845)
1906 – Maria Georgina Grey, English educator, founded the Girls' Day School Trust (b. 1816)
1924 – Alick Bannerman, Australian cricketer and coach (b. 1854)
1927 – Michael Ancher, Danish painter (b. 1849)
1935 – Konstantin Tsiolkovsky, Russian scientist and engineer (b. 1857)
1936 – Vishnu Narayan Bhatkhande, Indian singer and musicologist (b. 1860)
1942 – Condé Montrose Nast, American publisher, founded Condé Nast Publications (b. 1873)
1944 – Guy Gibson, Indian-English commander, Victoria Cross recipient (b. 1918)
1949 – George Shiels, Irish-Canadian playwright (b. 1886)
  1949   – Nikos Skalkottas, Greek violinist and composer (b. 1901)
1955 – John D. Dingell, Sr., American journalist and politician (b. 1894)
1965 – Lionel Terray, French mountaineer (b. 1921)
1967 – Zinaida Serebriakova, Ukrainian-French painter (b. 1884)
1968 – Chester Carlson, American physicist and lawyer (b. 1906)
  1968   – Red Foley, American singer-songwriter and actor (b. 1910)
1972 – Robert Casadesus, French pianist and composer (b. 1899)
1973 – Gram Parsons, American singer-songwriter and guitarist (b. 1946)
1975 – Pamela Brown, English actress (b. 1917)
1978 – Étienne Gilson, French historian and philosopher (b. 1884)
1985 – Italo Calvino, Italian novelist, short story writer, and journalist (b. 1923)
1987 – Einar Gerhardsen, Norwegian civil servant and politician, 1st Prime Minister of Norway (b. 1897)
1989 – Willie Steele, American long jumper (b. 1923)
1990 – Ian Moir, Australian rugby league player (b. 1932)
  1990   – Hermes Pan, American dancer and choreographer (b. 1910)
1992 – Jacques Pic, French chef (b. 1932)
1995 – Orville Redenbacher, American businessman, founded his own eponymous brand (b. 1907)
1998 – Patricia Hayes, English actress (b. 1909)
2000 – Ann Doran, American actress (b. 1911)
2001 – Rhys Jones, Welsh-Australian archaeologist and academic (b. 1941)
2002 – Robert Guéï, Ivorian politician, 3rd President of Côte d'Ivoire (b. 1941)
2003 – Slim Dusty, Australian singer-songwriter, guitarist, and producer (b. 1927)
2004 – Eddie Adams, American photographer and journalist (b. 1933)
  2004   – Skeeter Davis, American singer-songwriter (b. 1931)
  2004   – Damayanti Joshi, Indian dancer and choreographer (b. 1928)
  2004   – Ellis Marsalis, Sr., American businessman and activist (b. 1908)
2006 – Elizabeth Allen, American actress (b. 1929)
  2006   – Danny Flores, American singer-songwriter and saxophonist (b. 1929)
  2006   – Martha Holmes, American photographer and journalist (b. 1923)
  2006   – Roy Schuiten, Dutch cyclist and manager (b. 1950)
2008 – Earl Palmer, American rhythm and blues drummer (b. 1924)
2009 – Milton Meltzer, American historian and author (b. 1915)
  2009   – Eduard Zimmermann, German journalist (b. 1929)
2011 – Thomas Capano, American lawyer and politician (b. 1949)
  2011   – Dolores Hope, American singer (b. 1909)
  2011   – George Cadle Price, 1st Prime Minister of Belize (b. 1919)
2012 – Rino Ferrario, Italian footballer (b. 1926)
  2012   – Cecil Gordon, American race car driver (b. 1941)
  2012   – Bettye Lane, American photographer and journalist (b. 1930)
  2012   – Itamar Singer, Romanian-Israeli historian and author (b. 1946)
2013 – Robert Barnard, English author and critic (b. 1936)
  2013   – John Reger, American football player (b. 1931)
  2013   – William Ungar, Polish-American author and philanthropist, founded the National Envelope Corporation (b. 1913)
  2013   – John D. Vanderhoof, American banker and politician, 37th Governor of Colorado (b. 1922)
  2013   – Hiroshi Yamauchi, Japanese businessman (b. 1927)
2014 – Audrey Long, American actress (b. 1922)
2015 – Jackie Collins, English novelist (b. 1937)
  2015   – Todd Ewen, Canadian ice hockey player and coach (b. 1966)
  2015   – Masajuro Shiokawa, Japanese economist and politician, 63rd Japanese Minister of Finance (b. 1921)
  2015   – Marcin Wrona, Polish director, producer, and screenwriter (b. 1973)
2017 – Leonid Kharitonov, Russian bass-baritone (b. 1933)
2018 – Arthur Mitchell, American ballet dancer & choreographer (b. 1934) 
 2018    – Bernard "Bunny" Carr, Irish TV presenter (b. 1927) 
2019 – Zine El Abidine Ben Ali, Tunisian soldier, politician, 2nd President of Tunisia  (b. 1936) 
2020 – John Turner, Canadian politician, 17th Prime Minister of Canada (b. 1929)
2021 – John Challis, English actor (b. 1942)
  2021   – Jimmy Greaves, English footballer (Chelsea, Tottenham Hotspur, national team), world champion (1966 FIFA World Cup) (b. 1940)
  2021   – Dinky Soliman, Filipino politician, 23rd Secretary of Social Welfare and Development (b. 1953)

Holidays and observances
 Christian feast day: 
 Alonso de Orozco Mena
 Emilie de Rodat
 Goeric of Metz 
 Januarius (Western Christianity)
 Feast of San Gennaro
 Our Lady of La Salette
 Theodore of Tarsus (Anglican Communion, Roman Catholic Church, Eastern Orthodox Church)
 Trophimus, Sabbatius, and Dorymedon
 September 19 (Eastern Orthodox liturgics)
 Armed Forces Day (Chile)
 Day of the First Public Appearance of the Slovak National Council
 Second day of Fiestas Patrias (Chile) 
 Independence Day, celebrates the independence of Saint Kitts and Nevis from the United Kingdom in 1983.
 International Talk Like a Pirate Day

References

External links

 
 
 

Days of the year
September